Alwiya al-Nasr or the Victory Brigades is a Syrian rebel group formed by 14 rebel factions in Azaz in an attempt to militarily and politically unite the separated opposition groups in the area. The group's goal aims to prevent the partition of northern Syria and to break the siege of Mare'. Soon after its formation in June 2016 its leaders were arrested by the Levant Front on allegations of cooperating with Russia.

References

External links
Victory Brigades Youtube channel

Free Syrian Army
Anti-government factions of the Syrian civil war
Anti-ISIL factions in Syria